Birds of prey are species of carnivorous birds.

Birds of Prey may also refer to:

Film
 Birds of Prey (1927 film), an American silent film directed by William James Craft 
 Birds of Prey (1930 film), a British mystery film directed by Basil Dean
 Birds of Prey (1973 film), a TV film starring David Janssen
 Birds of Prey (2020 film), a film in the DC Extended Universe based on the Batman spin-off comics property Birds of Prey

Literature
 Birds of Prey (Drake novel), a 1984 novel by David Drake
 Birds of Prey (Smith novel), a 1997 novel by Wilbur Smith
 Birds of Prey (team), a fictional group in comic books published by DC Comics

Games
 Birds of Prey (video game), a 1992 flight simulator for the Amiga and IBM PC by Argonaut Games
 IL-2 Sturmovik: Birds of Prey, a 2009 combat flight simulation game
 Birds of Prey, a table top air combat game from Ad Astra Games

Music
 Birds of Prey (band), a heavy metal super group
 Birds of Prey (Godley & Creme album), a 1983 album by Godley & Creme
 Birds of Prey (Hank Roberts album), a 1990 album by Hank Roberts
 "Birds of Prey", a song by Christina Aguilera from Bionic

Television
 Birds of Prey (TV series), a 2002 TV drama series
 "Birds of Prey" (Arrow), an episode of Arrow

Other uses
 Birds of Prey (ski course), Beaver Creek, Colorado, United States

See also
 Bird of Prey (disambiguation)
 Birds of Pray, a 2003 album by Live
 List of fictional birds of prey